"Peopling of Oceania" may refer to:
the Paleolithic Great Coastal Migration (65,000 years ago onward)
 Australo-Melanesians
 Melanesians
 History of Indigenous Australians#Origins
the Mesolithic Austronesian expansion  (5,000 years ago onward)